Sean Berens is an American ice hockey coach and retired center who was an All-American for Michigan State.

Career
Berens' college career began in the fall of 1994 when he debuted as a freshman for the Michigan State Spartans. As a senior he was named alternate captain and responded with his best season, leading the nation with 36 goals. He was named an All-American and helped the Spartans win the CCHA Tournament. As they had in each of Berens' season, Michigan State lost their opening game of the NCAA Tournament.

After graduating Berens began his professional career. Over a three-season span he moved between eight different teams in four leagues. While he did spend most of his time playing AAA hockey, Berens' decided to head to Europe in 2001. He played in four more teams in as many years, playing in five leagues across three countries. He retired as a player in 2005.

After returning to North America, Berens became a youth hockey coach in the Chicago area. He has been the head coach in the Team Illinois AAA organization since 2006 and also operates his own ice hockey training academy.

Statistics

Regular season and playoffs

Awards and honors

References

External links

1976 births
Living people
AHCA Division I men's ice hockey All-Americans
American men's ice hockey centers
Ice hockey people from Illinois
People from Skokie, Illinois
Michigan State Spartans men's ice hockey players
Tacoma Sabercats players
Saint John Flames players
Las Vegas Thunder players
Chicago Wolves players
Cleveland Lumberjacks players
Springfield Falcons players
Baton Rouge Kingfish players
Belfast Giants players
Vienna Capitals players
SC Langenthal players
HC Fribourg-Gottéron players
American expatriate ice hockey players in Canada
American expatriate ice hockey players in Northern Ireland
American expatriate ice hockey players in Austria
American expatriate ice hockey players in Switzerland